Amritsar MetroBus (Amritsar BRTS) is the bus rapid transit system (BRTS) in the city of Amritsar, Punjab, India.  Amritsar MetroBus allows easy travel to different places in city like the Golden Temple, Jallianwala Bagh, Guru Nanak Dev University and Khalsa College for nominal fares. The time gap or frequency between two buses on the same route is five minutes.

Construction and Operation
Construction work started on 26 February, 2015. In September, 2016, 90% of work was completed. Amritsar BRTS is based on Ahmedabad BRTS model  and was constructed on the lines of Metrobus (Istanbul). Volvo Buses showed its interest in BRTS project at the holy city of Amritsar. The Amritsar MetroBus operates with 93 Air-conditioned AT buses by Tata Marcopolo. After the launch MetroBus recorder ridership of 41,000 passengers within one week. Amritsar BRTS authorities sold more than 8,000 smart cards to daily passengers within a week. The transportation system is completely free for school students in uniform up to senior secondary classes. After launch, for first three month project was free of cost for commuters.

Key features
Some of the key features of Amritsar BRTS are:
Automatic Doors at metro Stations for passengers safety
Overheard bridges for pedestrians
Two different lanes for movement of buses in both directions
Intersections will act as boarding place for the buses
Complete Air conditioned buses
Automated doors of all buses
Lifts for commuters at Metro Stations on elevated corridor
A special Metro smart Card similar to that like in Metro Rails 
Smart Announcements at Metro Stations and in Metro Buses similar to those in Metro Railways
Retrofitted Metro Stations on elevated corridor

Corridors
Metro Bus's 46 km route have multiple routes  and corridors: 
 Atari Road – ISBT to India Gate via Bhandari Bridge, GNDU, Chheharta (12 km)
 Jalandhar Road – ISBT to MCA Gate via Tarawalan Pul (6 km)
 Verka Road – ISBT to Verka via Hussainpura Bridge, G. T. Road Bypass (13 km)
 Sham Singh Attari Wala gate and Bhandari Bridge  to India Gate
 Bhandari Bridge to Daburji 
 Daburji Bypass to Verka
 Verka to Celebration Mall 
 Celebration Mall to Sant Singh Sukha Singh Chowk
 4S Chowk to Kitchlu Chowk
 Kitchlu Chowk to Old Sadar Police Station
 Amritsar International Airport to Golden Temple/Ghee Mandi (launched in August 2021)

In February 2019, citizens demanded service to be extended to Circular road because of frequent traffic congestion in the area. 

In August 2021, A new route 501 (UP/DWN) was launched directly connecting Amritsar International Airport with Golden Temple, The new route comprises 14.15 Km and 14 Metro Stations

Green mobility
Amritsar Smart City Limited planned to add additional 30 Electric buses and 9,000 electric Auto rickshaws for feeder service to the Amritsar BRTS.

Awards and recognition
In November, 2019 at 12th urban India mobility conference and exhibition in Lucknow, Amritsar MetroBus bagged an award of excellence under the category of ‘Best Urban Mass Transit System’ from Ministry of Housing and Urban Affairs, India.

See also
 Golden temple
 Tourism in Amritsar

References

External links
Amritsar BRTS - United Nations ESCAP
Bus Rapid Transit System For Amritsar

Transport in Amritsar
Bus rapid transit in India
2016 establishments in Punjab, India